Hiram Merrill (January 14, 1829September 5, 1908) was an American businessman and Wisconsin pioneer.  He was the 18th mayor of Janesville, Wisconsin, and a member of the Wisconsin State Assembly.

Biography
Merrill was born on January 14, 1829, in Adams, New York, and came to what is now Milwaukee, Wisconsin, in 1837, where his father ran the Traveler's Inn at Walker's Point. Hiram worked in his father's shipyard, then headed west in 1849 for the California gold rush, where he sold water for hydraulic mining. On October 20, 1856, he married Louise Ballard. Merrill and his wife were Episcopalians. They had four children. He died on June 9, 1893.

Career
In 1866 the Merrills settled in Janesville, Wisconsin, where Hiram gained control of the New Gas Light Company. He was elected to the Assembly in 1874, defeating incumbent John Winans, who later became a member of the United States House of Representatives. Other positions Merrill held include Mayor of Janesville. He was an Independent Republican.

References

People from Adams, New York
Politicians from Milwaukee
Politicians from Janesville, Wisconsin
Members of the Wisconsin State Assembly
Mayors of places in Wisconsin
Wisconsin Republicans
Wisconsin Independents
19th-century American Episcopalians
1829 births
1893 deaths
19th-century American politicians